Heinrich August Luyken (10 December 1864 in Altenkirchen – 21 September 1947 in Amersham) is an author of various adventure novels in Esperanto.

Heinrich Luyken attended gymnasium in Düsseldorf. In 1885 he emigrated to England and acquired citizenship. He married the Englishwoman Alice Maud Marian Newbon and they had four children.

He learnt Esperanto in the year 1904 and he soon began propagating it. Heinrich Luyken is considered one of the main writers of Esperanto literature before the Second World War. He published four adventure novels between 1912 and 1924, in which his evangelical faith is reflected. In every novel the protagonist is a heretic who is "saved" by their faith.

Bibliography 
 Paŭlo Debenham. British Esperanto Association, London/Genf 1912
 Mirinda amo. British Esperanto Association, London 1913
 Stranga heredaĵo. Ferdinand Hirt & Sohn, Esperanto-Fako, Leipzig 1922
 Pro Iŝtar. Ferdinand Hirt & Sohn, Esperanto-Fako, Leipzig 1924

External links 
 Biography in Esperanto
 Genealogy of Heinrich Luyken

1864 births
1947 deaths
Writers of Esperanto literature